Events in the year 1933 in Norway.

Incumbents
Monarch – Haakon VII

Events

 3 March – Johan Ludwig Mowinckel becomes new prime minister. 
 17 May – Vidkun Quisling and Johan Bernhard Hjort establish the Norwegian fascist party "Nasjonal Samling" ("National Unity")
 1 July – The Norwegian Broadcasting Corporation (NRK) is founded.
 24 July – The Parliament grants the Norwegian Broadcasting Corporation (NRK) monopoly on radio broadcasting in Norway.
 4 September - The Christian Democratic Party is founded as a local party in Hordaland og gets one representative in the parliamentary election.
 5 September - Norway and Denmark agreed to settle their dispute over Eastern Greenland (Erik the Red's Land and King Frederick VI Coast) in what became known as the "Greenland case" (Grønlandssaken) at the Permanent Court of International Justice. Norway lost and after the ruling it abandoned its claims.
 16 October – The 1933 Parliamentary election takes place.

Popular culture

Sports

Music

Film

Literature
 The Knut Hamsund novel Men Livet lever Volume 1 & 2 (The Road Leads On), was published.
 En flyktning krysser sitt spor (A Fugitive Crosses His Tracks) by Aksel Sandemose was published.

Notable births
  
 
 

7 January – Bjarne Lingås, boxer
8 January – Anne Petrea Vik, politician and Minister
10 January – Stein Haugen, discus thrower
19 February – Kåre Øvregard, politician
4 March – Unni Bernhoft, actress.
11 March – Henrik J. Lisæth, politician
25 March – Bjørn Pedersen, chemist.
29 March – Edvard Grimstad, politician
4 April – Ola Byrknes, politician
8 April – Tore Lindbekk, sociologist and politician
10 April – Oddlaug Vereide, politician (died 2021).
12 April – Ingvar Lars Helle, politician (died 2003)
15 April – Kjell Svindland, politician
18 April – Leif Eldring, judge and civil servant (died 1994)
21 April – Nils Aas, sculptor (died 2004)
25 April – Herbjørn Sørebø, media personality (died 2003).
29 April – Jarle Høysæter, journalist
10 May – Reidar Engell Olsen, politician
11 May – Hauk Buen, hardingfele fiddler and fiddle maker (died 2021).
11 May – Jan Einar Greve, lawyer
2 June – Åse Hiorth Lervik, literary researcher (died 1997)
5 June – Per Ung, sculptor
20 June – Knut Engdahl, politician
12 July – Ingrid Eide, sociologist, United Nations official and politician
14 July – Lars Monrad Krohn, engineer and entrepreneur
24 July – Arne Hamarsland, middle-distance runner
6 August – Eva R. Finstad, politician (died 1998)
12 August – Einar Knut Holm, politician
16 August – Reiulf Steen, politician
16 August – Dagfinn Bakke, painter, illustrator and graphical artist.
19 August – Asmund Bjørken, folk musician (d. 2018)
27 August - Agnes Nygaard Haug, judge
6 September – Bjørg Skjælaaen, figure skater (died 2019).
10 October - Ragnar Udjus, media personality and politician
31 October - Sverre Stensheim, cross country skier
1 November - Gunvor Krogsæter, politician
6 November - Knut Johannesen, speed skater and double Olympic gold medallist
6 November – Anne-Lise Seip, historian and politician
8 November – Eli Kristiansen, politician
9 November – Egil Danielsen, javelin thrower and Olympic gold medallist
14 November – Else Reppen, philanthropist (died 2006)
16 November – Johan Henrik Schreiner, historian
19 December – Kolbein Falkeid, poet
28 December – Inger Bjørnbakken, alpine skier and World Champion
31 December – Sigurd Osberg, bishop

Full date unknown
Per Maltby, astronomer (died 2006)

Notable deaths

7 February – Vetle Vislie, educationalist and writer (born 1858)
1 March – Fredrik Georg Gade, physician (born 1855)
2 April – Martinus Lørdahl, businessperson, multi sports competitor and sports administrator (born 1873).
29 May – Johan Henrik Rye Holmboe, businessperson, politician and Minister (born 1863)
20 May – Gunder Anton Johannesen Jahren, politician and Minister (born 1858)
7 June – Edvard Hans Hoff, politician and Minister (born 1838)
29 June – Olaf Bull, poet (born 1883)
10 July – Vilhelm Krag, author (born 1871)
17 July – Anders Buen, typographer, newspaper editor, trade unionist and politician (born 1864)
22 July – Johan Bøgh, museum director and art historian (born 1848)
13 August – Birger Stuevold-Hansen, politician and Minister (born 1870)
26 October – Erik Enge, politician and Minister (born 1852)
28 October – Magne Johnsen Rongved, politician (born 1858)
29 November – Nikka Vonen, educator, folklorist and author (b. 1836).

Full date unknown
Johan Arndt, politician (born 1876)
Peter Karl Holmesland, jurist and politician (born 1866)

See also

References

External links